Members of the New South Wales Legislative Assembly  who served in the 14th parliament of New South Wales held their seats from 1889 to 1891. They were elected at the 1889 colonial election between 1 and 16 February 1889. The Speaker was James Young until 21 October 1890 and then Joseph Palmer Abbott.

By-elections

Under the constitution, ministers were required to resign to recontest their seats in a by-election when appointed. These by-elections are only noted when the minister was defeated; in general, he was elected unopposed.

See also
Fifth Parkes ministry
Results of the 1889 New South Wales colonial election
Candidates of the 1889 New South Wales colonial election

References

Members of New South Wales parliaments by term
19th-century Australian politicians